José Ricardo Mazó (Pilar, 1927- Asunción, 1987), the Paraguayan poet, was born in Pilar, in the department of Ñeembucú . He was a member of the Literary Academy of the  College of San José and of the Paraguayan Academia Universitaria. After completing his studies in San José, he studied in the University of Texas at Austin and subsequently worked as an Engineer and Geologist.

He is regarded as one of the Promoción del 50, a group of 1950's poets, mainly from the Academia Universitaria and the Faculty of Philosophy in Asunción who wrote socially engaged poetry during Alfredo Stroessner's dictatorship (1954–1989).  His poem, ERA EL MES DE NIZAM..., should perhaps be read in that light.

He translated the lecture notes on Aesthetics that Hegel had distributed in the University of Berlin into Spanish as Introducción a la Estética de G.W:F. Hegel.

Poetic work  
Briznas: suerte de antología (Scraps: A kind of Anthology), 1982, gathers together 73 poems written between the years 1940 and 1980. The book is organised into five parts: 
 First poems;
 Empty hours;
 Return;
 The second solitude;
 Open bastion.

Solitude, absence, nostalgia, distance, boredom ... as well as a constant search for the self, a recurrent encounter with time, and  fixation on an unceasing memory, are the dominant motifs of his poetry. In several of his poems, the poetic voice alludes to a mysterious angel.

Bibliography 
 Briznas: suerte de antología, Asunción: Perch, 1982. (Poetry, 2). 111 pp.
 Poesía 1, Asunción: Academia Universitaria, 1953. [a collaboration.]
 Introducción a la estética / Georg Wihelm Friedrich Hegel, Ricardo Mazó (trans), Barcelona : Península, (1971, 2001),

References
 Poesía del Paraguay: antología desde sus orígenes, Aramí (ed.), 2001, pp. 555–559 (an anthology of Paraguayan Poetry)
 Breve diccionario de la literatura paraguaya, Méndez-Faith, Teresa, Asunción: El Lector, (Colección Literaria, 22; Biblioteca Paraguaya), 1996, p. 166, (a brief dictionary of Paraguayan Literature)

External links
 A brief dictionary of Paraguayan Literature (in Spanish)

1927 births
1987 deaths
20th-century Paraguayan poets
Paraguayan male poets
People from Ñeembucú Department
20th-century male writers
University of Texas at Austin alumni
Paraguayan expatriates in the United States